Dr. Lo Kwee-seong, CBE, JP (2 February 1910 – 5 May 1995) was a Hong Kong businessman, investor and philanthropist. He was the founder of the Vitasoy, a well-known soymilk drink company in Hong Kong. He was also an unofficial member of the Urban Council and the Legislative Council of Hong Kong and the chairman of the Hong Kong Consumer Council.

Lo died on 5 May 1995 at Queen Mary Hospital, aged 85. He was survived by his wife Elizabeth Lo Shing. His business position was succeeded by his son Winston Lo Yau-lai.

References

External links
 A Unique Legacy: Hong Kong’s Chinese Antiquities Collections

1910 births
1995 deaths
Alumni of the University of Hong Kong
Commanders of the Order of the British Empire
Hong Kong chief executives
Hong Kong industrialists
Hong Kong investors
Hong Kong philanthropists
Hong Kong people of Hakka descent
People from Meixian District
Hong Kong Protestants
Members of the Legislative Council of Hong Kong
Members of the Urban Council of Hong Kong
20th-century philanthropists